The 30th General Assembly of Nova Scotia represented Nova Scotia between 1890 and 1894.

The Liberal Party led by William Stevens Fielding formed the government.

Michael J. Power was chosen as speaker for the house.

The assembly was dissolved on February 14, 1894.

List of Members 

Notes:

References 
 

Terms of the General Assembly of Nova Scotia
1890 establishments in Nova Scotia
1894 disestablishments in Nova Scotia
19th century in Nova Scotia